In mathematics, Dedekind cuts, named after German mathematician Richard Dedekind but previously considered by Joseph Bertrand, are а method of construction of the real numbers from the rational numbers. A Dedekind cut is a partition of the rational numbers into two  sets A and B, such that all elements of A are less than all elements of B, and A contains no greatest element. The set B may or may not have a smallest element among the rationals. If B has a smallest element among the rationals, the cut corresponds to that rational. Otherwise, that cut defines a unique irrational number which, loosely speaking, fills the "gap" between A and B. In other words, A contains every rational number less than the cut, and B contains every rational number greater than or equal to the cut. An irrational cut is equated to an irrational number which is in neither set. Every real number, rational or not, is equated to one and only one cut of rationals.

Dedekind cuts can be generalized from the rational numbers to any totally ordered set by defining a Dedekind cut as a partition of a totally ordered set into two non-empty parts A and B, such that A is closed downwards (meaning that for all a in A, x ≤ a implies that x is in A as well) and B is closed upwards, and A contains no greatest element. See also completeness (order theory).

It is straightforward to show that a Dedekind cut among the real numbers is uniquely defined by the corresponding cut among the rational numbers. Similarly, every cut of reals is identical to the cut produced by a specific real number (which can be identified as the smallest element of the B set). In other words, the number line where every real number is defined as a Dedekind cut of rationals is a complete continuum without any further gaps.

Definition 

A Dedekind cut is a partition of the rationals  into two subsets  and  such that

  is nonempty.
  (equivalently,  is nonempty).
( is "closed downwards".)
 If , then there exists a  such that . ( does not contain a greatest element.)

By omitting  the first two requirements, we formally obtain the extended real number line.

Representations 

It is more symmetrical to use the (A, B) notation for Dedekind cuts, but each of A and B does determine the other. It can be a simplification, in terms of notation if nothing more, to concentrate on one "half" — say, the lower one — and call any downward closed set A without greatest element a "Dedekind cut".

If the ordered set S is complete, then, for every Dedekind cut (A, B) of S, the set B must have a minimal element b, 
hence we must have that  A is the interval (−∞, b), and B the interval [b, +∞).
In this case, we say that b is represented by the cut (A, B).

The important purpose of the Dedekind cut is to work with number sets that are not complete. The cut itself can represent a number not in the original collection of numbers (most often rational numbers). The cut can represent a number b, even though the numbers contained in the two sets A and B do not actually include the number b that their cut represents.

Ordering of cuts
Regard one Dedekind cut (A, B) as less than another Dedekind cut (C, D) (of the same superset) if A is a proper subset of C. Equivalently, if D is a proper subset of B, the cut (A, B) is again less than (C, D). In this way, set inclusion can be used to represent the ordering of numbers, and all other relations (greater than, less than or equal to, equal to, and so on) can be similarly created from set relations.

The set of all Dedekind cuts is itself a linearly ordered set (of sets). Moreover, the set of Dedekind cuts has the least-upper-bound property, i.e., every nonempty subset of it that has any upper bound has a least upper bound.  Thus, constructing the set of Dedekind cuts serves the purpose of embedding the original ordered set S, which might not have had the least-upper-bound property, within a (usually larger) linearly ordered set that does have this useful property.

Construction of the real numbers

A typical Dedekind cut of the rational numbers  is given by the partition  with

This cut represents the irrational number  in Dedekind's construction. The essential idea is that we use a set , which is the set of all rational numbers whose squares are less than 2, to "represent" number , and further, by defining properly arithmetic operators over these sets (addition, subtraction, multiplication, and division), these sets (together with these arithmetic operations) form the familiar real numbers.

The choice  works, thus  is indeed a cut. Now armed with the multiplication between cuts, it is easy to check that  (essentially, this is because ). Therefore to show that , we show that , and it suffices to show that for any , there exists , .

Note that the equality  cannot hold since  is not rational.

Relation to interval arithmetic

Given a Dedekind cut representing the real number  by splitting the rationals into 
This corresponds exactly to the set of intervals approximating .

This allows the basic arithmetic operations on the real numbers to be defined in terms of interval arithmetic.

Generalizations

Arbitrary linearly ordered sets
Some authors add the requirement that both A and B are nonempty.

If neither A has a maximum, nor B has a minimum, the cut is called a gap. A linearly ordered set endowed with the order topology is compact if and only if it has no gap.

Surreal numbers
A construction resembling Dedekind cuts is used for (one among many possible) constructions of surreal numbers. The relevant notion in this case is a Cuesta-Dutari cut, named after the Spanish mathematician .

Partially ordered sets

More generally, if S is a partially ordered set, a completion of S means a complete lattice L with an order-embedding of S into L. The notion of complete lattice generalizes the least-upper-bound property of the reals.

One completion of S is the set of its downwardly closed subsets, ordered by inclusion. A related completion that preserves all existing sups and infs of S is obtained by the following construction: For each subset A of S, let Au denote the set of upper bounds of A, and let Al denote the set of lower bounds of A. (These operators form a Galois connection.) Then the Dedekind–MacNeille completion of S consists of all subsets A for which (Au)l = A; it is ordered by inclusion. The Dedekind-MacNeille completion is the smallest complete lattice with S embedded in it.

Notes

References
Dedekind, Richard, Essays on the Theory of Numbers, "Continuity and Irrational Numbers," Dover Publications: New York, . Also available at Project Gutenberg.

External links
 

 
Order theory
Rational numbers
Real numbers